The Citroën C3 Picasso is a car produced by the French motor company Citroën from 2008–2017. It has a five-door mini MPV design and was first unveiled at the 2008 Paris Motor Show as a concept car named "Drooneel". The Picasso is the mini MPV version of the Citroën C3 and the successor of the Citroën Xsara Picasso, and was designed to compete with the Opel Meriva, Nissan Note, Renault Modus and Ford Fusion.

The C3 Picasso was assembled in December 2007 at the PSA Trnava Plant in Slovakia, which Citroën announced from France in July 2008 would be the sole manufacturer of the model. Citroën presented the finished product to the Slovak press and public on 25 September before it was unveiled to the world in October at the 2008 Paris Motor Show. The company began to sell the car in other European markets in March 2009.

A SUV-styled derivative named Citroën C3 Aircross (then Citroën Aircross) was manufactured in Brazil and sold in Latin America from 2010 to 2020. This model gave birth to a more urban-styled vehicle called C3 Picasso (manufactured in Brazil from 2011 to 2015), which was closer to the Brazilian C3 Aircross than to the global C3 Picasso. Both C3 Aircross and the Brazilian C3 Picasso were based on the Brazilian first generation Citroën C3, when the global C3 Picasso was based on the global Peugeot 207 SW.

When launched in Spain in 2009, only three trims were available: LX, SX, or Exclusive.

A redesigned version of the car was shown at the 2012 Paris Motor Show on 27 September 2012 and was on sale in Europe by November.

Models
Exclusive is consistently the most expensive trim for each market, with the biggest choice of engines and features. It is the only model to feature roof rails and a folding front passenger seat, making the storage space into the whole interior of the car except the driver's seat. Extras for the trim include: tinted windows, rear parking sensors, automatic windscreen wipers, a leather and chrome interior, pollen filter, and dual-zone automatic climate control, which allows for two varying temperature settings simultaneously in the vehicle.

Limited and Special Edition
90th Anniversary; the release of the Limited Edition 90th Anniversary C3 Picasso in August 2009 was the UK's third limited edition model. It was created to commemorate 90 years of Citroën and has similar features to the Exclusive trim, sold at the same price and features the MyWay SatNav system, leather upholstery, and a commemorative badge on the dashboard emblazoned with the wording "90 Years". The model was limited to 150 cars in the UK, of which only one has been sold and registered for use.
Blackcherry is a limited edition trim, available in the UK since November 2010 and based on the VTR+. It was sold with the 1.6-litre High-pressure Direct Injection (HDi) diesel engine. It was discontinued and replaced with the Code Red and Code White in January 2012, which have the same engine.
Rossignol; first collection launched in November 2010, second in November 2011.
Millennium; several trims were released in France under the Millennium moniker, including the: C1, C4, C4 Picasso, C5 and C5 Tourer. The model has 16-inch (41 cm) alloy wheels, the MyWay SatNav system and radio with built-in Bluetooth and dual-zone automatic climate control. The car was available in a metallic or pearlescent finish.
Code Red/Code White was released in January 2012. The limited edition C3 Picasso Code Red and Code White replaced the Blackcherry in the UK. The Code has the same engine as the Blackcherry and has been finely tuned for a marginally increased fuel economy and lower carbon dioxide emissions. It features obsidian black bumpers and 17-inch (43 cm) Polar White or Cherry Red "clover" alloy wheels, and can be equipped with extra features, which include roof bars, curtain airbags, cruise control and a speed limiter. Body colours exclusive to the trim are Belle Ile Blue, Shark Grey and Cherry Red.
Passion Bleus was released in France to celebrate the 2012 European Football Championship. The name is a tribute to the France national football team, which Citroën supports as a partner of the French Football Federation. The advertising campaign for the Passion Bleus involved French footballers, rallying champion Sébastien Loeb, and an online Facebook game "Le Pilote et le Bleu" (The Pilot and Blue). Other Citroën vehicles to receive a Passion Bleus trim were the: C1, C3, C4, C4 Picasso, and the Berlingo Multispace.
Music Touch was launched in January 2013 in France. Created through a partnership with Samsung and Universal Music Group, the C3 Picasso Music Touch comes with a free white Samsung Galaxy Tab 16 GB. The obvious styling differences are the additional chrome trims and mirror covers, and white pearlescent paint. The Music Touch special series was also added to the C4 Picasso, C4 Aircross and Berlingo Multispace vehicles.

Design and features

All C3 Picasso models have an anti-lock braking system (ABS), Electronic brakeforce distribution (EBD), child locks, remote central locking and two front airbags. Electronic Stability Control (ESC), once an option, is now included across the range. The Exclusive model features a folding front passenger seat to increase the storage space further. All models in the range have a "Mistral Maxi Taylor" woven cloth interior; according to Citroën, top European engineers and designers including Donato Coco and Jean-Pierre Ploué were involved in designing the vehicle.

Optional accessories are available for the range, including an aluminium roof rack capable of carrying  and kerbside lights in the door mirrors. Also available are:  and  alloy wheels with a choice of two patterns, chrome mouldings for the bumpers and doors, front fog lamps and cruise control, rear parking sensors, automatic lights (standard on some variants), and a speed limitation devicewhich are commonly used for safety reasons or to reduce fuel bills.
A seatbelt reminder, which can be added to the passenger and rear seats, is fitted to the driver's seat as standard.

The chassis platform used for the C3 Picasso is a modified version of that in the Citroën C3 and the Peugeot 207, giving it a comparable wheelbase. The reuse of automobile platforms is commonplace, especially for Citroën because the Trnava plant builds the Peugeot 207 and the C3 Picasso. The parent company PSA Peugeot Citroën pools resources and manufacturing for some vehicles, and sometimes rebadges vehicles, combining design teams between two or more brands to create a shared product. Citroën placed a contractual obligation on the manufacturers to use green materials for the C3 Picasso range.

Engines
This 1.6-litre and a smaller 1.4-litre VTi petrol engine, were developed by PSA Peugeot Citroën and BMW, along with a 1.6 L diesel engine and the two 1.6 L HDi Airdream engines. Every model came with a 5-speed manual gearbox until 2011, when 6-speed manual and automatic (EGS6) manual versions were introduced, along with an eco-friendly start-stop system and regenerative braking technology in certain models, notably the Exclusive and Tendance models for the German market. According to Citroën, these two new features reduce  emissions significantly and their introduction coincided with the release of a higher specification Airdream engine, the European emission standards (Euro 5) carbon dioxide emissions limits were lowered and the addition of low-rolling resistance tyres were added to the entire range. The tyres are specially designed to minimize wasted energy when the tyre rolls and have been estimated by the California Energy Commission to save 1.5–4.5% of fuel in a typical car.

At first, Citroën decided not to offer their new automatic EGS6 gearbox version in the UK due to the unfavourable exchange rate and costs, although this changed after a small number were privately imported for insurance classification purposes. The EGS6 gearbox became an option for the 1.6 L VTi engine models shortly after.

Starting with June 2015 production, Citroën replaced the older petrol engines with a 1.2-litre Pure Tech 110 motor. This new 3 cylinder 110 hp engine is paired with 5 speed manual transmission. CO2 emissions are 115g/km. A 73 kW BlueHDi 100 diesel coupled to a 5 speed manual transmission replaced the earlier offerings.  The EGS6 automatic transmission is no longer available.

The complete vehicle lineup includes multiple models and engine configurations, all with different specifications and tuning:

Safety

The European New Car Assessment Programme (Euro NCAP) tested a C3 Picasso Confort  model with standard equipment, including: a single forward airbag for each front seat, a speed limitation device, but no ESC. The vehicle was scored on the basis of: child and adult injury, including whiplash risk from the seating, a pedestrian front impact rating, safety equipment and clear labels detailing how to disable some features. The results of the front end tests were mixed, with the bumper scoring all available points, but the vehicle was penalised for the lack of protection and the potential damage caused if a pedestrian is struck by the bonnet. Protection inside the car was scored highly for almost every seat, and for adult and child protection; it lost points for its use of forward-facing restraints, which can be fatal in an accident if an infant is hit by an airbag. The C3 Picasso was also penalised for offering very poor whiplash protection in the driver's seatscoring nothing in two of the three tests and then losing points for the position of the unadjusted restraint. Overall, the vehicle scored four of five stars, less than most vehicles the Euro NCAP compares it with, which were released around the same time.

Recalls and Watchdog investigation

On 20 June 2010, 611 C3 Picassos built between January and March 2010 were recalled due to incorrectly routed fuel pipes, which were believed to have been in contact with the heat shield. This fault may have caused chafing and may lead to a fuel leak. The models were built between January and March 2010 and were sold in the UK. On 24 August 2010, all 13,234 Picassos sold in the UK were recalled because the windscreen trim could deteriorate, and could eventually detach, leading to a loose-fitting windscreen.

In May 2011, all 24,091 C3 Picassos in the UK were recalled for a safety modification, following complaints and an investigation by BBC consumer affairs programme Watchdog into brakes that could be activated on the passenger side of the right-hand drive vehicles.
The problem occurred because of the way the vehicles were modified for right-hand-drive. The investigation showed that although the brake pedal had been moved to the right, it was still connected to a mechanism on the passenger side. This was covered by felt carpet and meant that both the front passenger and driver could activate the brakes. A further investigation by Watchdog later found the same problem in other Citroën models and some vehicles produced by Renault and Peugeot, some of which were registered in 2002. All three manufacturers worked with the Vehicle and Operator Services Agency (VOSA) to identify the severity of the problem but no vehicles were found to be affected enough to issue recalls.

8,815 Picassos built between January and May 2011 for the UK market were recalled on 2 September 2011 when it was discovered that the battery cable was too short and could cause gearbox failures and in turn stall the engine. The faulty earth return cable was replaced. Despite the recalls, the vehicle continued to sell well in the UK and has won numerous awards.

Reviews

Critics praised the Citroën C3 Picasso in reviews for its ergonomics, Bauhaus-inspired styling, ease of use and the amount of space offered. Many reviewers criticised the interior, which they said felt "cheap". The quality and reliability of the petrol engines was also criticised by most reviewers as "sluggish" and struggling to carry the weight of the vehicle, although the diesel engines feedback was more positive as they are able to cope much better and run smoother. Reviewers' comments about the tight turning radius of the vehicle were favourable. The combination of the panoramic three-part windscreen, thin door pillars and high seats, which together increase the visibility of the roadled one reviewer to compare it with a greenhouse.

The car has three monitors on the dashboard, the first monitors the status of important components, while the second controls the sound system, and the last is a rev counter, digital speedometer and the fuel gauge. CNET described the speed gauge monitor as clear and "close to the driver's natural line of sight", but criticized the other two monitors for being unreadable and possibly dangerous if used by the driver while the car is moving. Some reviewers complained about the vehicle's soundproofing, which could not adequately conceal the screech of the wind. The engine at high speed received mixed reviews, while a number of reviewers reported a fault with the screenwash bottle, which can freeze in cold weather and blow a fuse when used. The reviewer for European Car of the Year 2010 called the nominated C3 Picasso fuel efficient, but said it had "dull steering".

Awards
UK publication Top Gear Magazine awarded the C3 Picasso "Family Car of the Year" in 2008, stating "This is what a 21st century family car should look like". Michael Harvey, the Editorial Director of the magazine admitted they had taken a chance as the model was not available in the United Kingdom until the following year.
In 2009 when the car was finally launched the awards increased, first with "Best MPV" at What Diesels Car of the Year Awards, "Scottish MPV of the Year" at the Scottish Car of the Year Awards, "Best Supermini MPV of the year" at "Auto Express New Car Awards" and finally "Design of the Year" at the Fleet World Honours.
The vehicle was nominated for European Car of the Year in 2010, but received the lowest overall score of any candidate, finishing last, in seventh place.
The JD Power survey in 2011 announced the C3 Picasso as the best MPV on the market, with a satisfaction rating of 83.1% and five stars overall, but with the lowest rating given to the exterior quality at three stars. Many reviewers had complained of poor fitting and the finish used on the exterior.

Advertising
"DOG"; was created by H Suresnes advertising agency in France and released in June 2010. The advertisement shows a dog made up of various items, including a purse, swimming goggles, blow-dryer and shoes, wandering around the streets to the English-language song "Somebody Come And Play" by Joseph G Raposo. In the last scene the dog is invited into the boot of a C3 Picasso by a family leaving for a holiday; the dog fits into the car with enough space to seat everyone comfortably.

Another advertisement for the vehicle range was "Ghostbusters Reloaded", which was produced by Euro RSCG Paris. It shows three futuristic Ghostbusters in a C3 Picasso battling a monster in the style of the Ghostbuters character Stay Puft Marshmallow Man. The monster is the size of a tall building and is made up of items including bicycles, suitcases and tyres. As the monster is defeated, it disassembles and the items fit into the boot of the Picasso. The music used is a remix of the Ray Parker Ghostbusters theme tune performed by the Street Life DJs. The advertisement's strapline is; "The New Citroën C3 Picasso: The Spacebox".

2012 facelift

The facelift of the Citroën C3 Picasso appeared first at the 2012 Paris Motor Show on 27 September. The new eMyWay SatNav system, located on the central console, is more functional than the previous model, allowing connection to a reversing camera (available as an extra), which displays on the console screen. LED daytime running lamps and fog lamps with built-in cornering lamps, which illuminate the roadside, are also non-standard features on the facelifted C3 Picasso. In addition, Citroën has added two new exterior paint colour options; "Pearlescent white" and "Ink blue" to the vehicle. The front grille now features Citroën's new branding, joining the two chrome chevron badge in the form of a crown.

The UK launch took place in December 2012.

2017 successor

In September 2010, Citroën do Brasil launched the Citroën C3 Aircross''' in Brazil and Argentina. The car is a C3 Picasso-based mini SUV with styling differences including: raised suspension, chrome roof bars and mirror covers, side skirts, and a rear spare tyre.

A successor for the C3 Picasso was previewed at the Geneva Motor Show in March as the C-Aircross Concept. The Citroën C3 Aircross, as it became called, launched in late 2017, introducing with it the new Citroën SUV designation. Auto Express'' reported the vehicle is taking design cues from the C-Aircross Concept, and will make the transition from MPV to an SUV design.

Worldwide sales and production figures

657,807 C3 Picasso have been produced in Trnava plant.

See also
List of Citroën vehicles

References

External links

Official UK C3 Picasso website
Official international Citroën website
The scale and numbers involved in the production
Production photographs from start to finish

2010s cars
C3
Euro NCAP small MPVs
Front-wheel-drive vehicles
Mini MPVs
Compact MPVs
Cars introduced in 2008